Peringathur is a census town in Thalassery taluk of Kannur district in the Indian state of Kerala. It is a part of Panoor municipality.

Demographics
As of 2011 Census, Peringathur had a population of 40,292. Males constitute 46% of the population and females were 54%. Peringathur had an average literacy rate of 96%, higher than the state average of 94%: male literacy was 97.6%, and female literacy was 94.6%. In Peringathur, 12.5% of the population was under 6 years of age.

Etymology
It is believed that the name "Peringathur" was derived from Peringalath Ur, which means the place where great wars took place.  It gradually came to be known as Peringathur.. Kanakamala is a developing tourist spot and the hill ranges of Wayanad and Mahe beach can be viewed from this hilltop.  

Peringathur town is situated in the southern border of Kannur district. Mayyazhi river flows through this town. Nearest towns include Panoor, Nadapuram, Kadavathur, Chokli, Thalassery, and Kuthuparamba.

Famous Personality 
Famous footballer V.P. Sathyan who represented Kerala in Santosh Trophy was born in Mekkunnu. P K Noushad Master who represent India (he was the only keralite) as a volunteer in FIFA world cup South africa, Brazil and volunteer coordinator in Russia .and also won FIFA Fair Play award along with other FIFA Brazil volunteers in the year 2015,and He was co-operating with Kerala Blasters in ISL.

Transportation
The national highway passes through Thalassery town.  Goa and Mumbai can be accessed on the northern side and Cochin and Thiruvananthapuram can be accessed on the southern side.  The road to the east of Iritty connects to Mysore and Bangalore.   The nearest railway station is Thalassery on Mangalore-Palakkad line. 
Trains are available to almost all parts of India subject to advance booking over the internet.  There three airports to Mangalore Airport[Mangalore]and Calicut International Airport 92km[Calicut]kannur international airport35km[kannur] all of them are international airports.

References

 Cities and towns in Kannur district